The MTV Video Music Award for Best Rap Video was first given out in 1989, and it was one of the four original genre categories added at the 1989 MTV Video Music Awards. This award was last given out in 2006, as MTV did not bring it back in 2008 like it did with other genre awards.  Instead, artists and videos that were previously eligible for Best Rap Video are now eligible for Best Hip-Hop Video.  Will Smith, Arrested Development, Dr. Dre, and Jay-Z are tied as this award's biggest winners, each having won it twice.

Recipients

References

See also 
 MTV Europe Music Award for Best Rap

MTV Video Music Awards
Awards established in 1989
Awards disestablished in 2006